A synchronous orbit is an orbit in which an orbiting body (usually a satellite) has a period equal to the average rotational period of the body being orbited (usually a planet), and in the same direction of rotation as that body.

Simplified meaning 
A synchronous orbit is an orbit in which the orbiting object (for example, an artificial satellite or a moon) takes the same amount of time to complete an orbit as it takes the object it is orbiting to rotate once.

Properties 
A satellite in a synchronous orbit that is both equatorial and circular will appear to be suspended motionless above a point on the orbited planet's equator. For synchronous satellites orbiting Earth, this is also known as a geostationary orbit. However, a synchronous orbit need not be equatorial; nor circular. A body in a non-equatorial synchronous orbit will appear to oscillate north and south above a point on the planet's equator, whereas a body in an elliptical orbit will appear to oscillate eastward and westward. As seen from the orbited body the combination of these two motions produces a figure-8 pattern called an analemma.

Nomenclature 
There are many specialized terms for synchronous orbits depending on the body orbited. The following are some of the more common ones. A synchronous orbit around Earth that is circular and lies in the equatorial plane is called a geostationary orbit. The more general case, when the orbit is inclined to Earth's equator or is non-circular is called a geosynchronous orbit. The corresponding terms for synchronous orbits around Mars are areostationary and areosynchronous orbits.

Formula 

For a stationary synchronous orbit:

 
 G = Gravitational constant
 m2 = Mass of the celestial body
 T = rotational period of the body

By this formula one can find the stationary orbit of an object in relation to a given body.

Orbital speed (how fast a satellite is moving through space) is calculated by multiplying the angular speed of the satellite by the orbital radius.

Examples 
An astronomical example is Pluto's largest moon Charon.
Much more commonly, synchronous orbits are employed by artificial satellites used for communication, such as geostationary satellites.

For natural satellites, which can attain a synchronous orbit only by tidally locking their parent body, it always goes in hand with synchronous rotation of the satellite. This is because the smaller body becomes tidally locked faster, and by the time a synchronous orbit is achieved, it has had a locked synchronous rotation for a long time already.

See also 
 Subsynchronous orbit
 Supersynchronous orbit 
 Graveyard orbit
 Tidal locking (synchronous rotation)
 Sun-synchronous orbit
 List of orbits

References

 

Astrodynamics
Orbits